Lokitanyala, Uganda is a settlement in the Moroto District in the Northern Region of Uganda. It lies directly across from Lokitanyala, Kenya, separated by the international border between Uganda and Kenya.

Location
The coordinates of Lokitanyala are 2°21'53.0"N, 34°55'13.0"E (Latitude:2.364728; Longitude:34.920284).

Overview
The town is one of the end points of the  Soroti–Katakwi–Moroto–Lokitanyala Road. The town is a border crossing between Uganda and neighboring Kenya.

See also
 List of roads in Uganda
 List of cities and towns in Uganda

References

External links

Populated places in Northern Region, Uganda
Moroto District
Kenya–Uganda border crossings